Laurène Meyniel-Schicklin is a bioinformatics engineer who specializes in genomic data science.

Career 
In 2014 she co-founded Enyo Pharma where she conducts research on a drug discovery engine which mimics viruses' ability to model the cellular functions of the host. She previously worked as an engineer with Inserm and taught at the Catholic University of Lyon.

Education 
She holds a degree in Bioinformatics from the University of Évry Val d'Essonne.

Awards and honors 
Laurène was featured in Forbes' Top 50 Women in Tech 2018 list, and she has been granted a patent.

References 

French women engineers
French bioinformaticians
Living people
Year of birth missing (living people)
Place of birth missing (living people)
French women company founders
21st-century French engineers
Pharmaceutical company founders
Women medical researchers
French medical researchers
21st-century French women